Clay Martin Croker (January 10, 1962 – September 17, 2016), generally credited as C. Martin Croker, was an American animator and voice actor. He was best known for having provided the voices of Dr. Weird, Zorak, and Moltar on the animated series Space Ghost Coast to Coast, replacing Don Messick and Ted Cassidy respectively, who originally voiced the characters in the 1960s series Space Ghost.

Career
Croker began his professional career in animation in 1988 by providing animation of the Laser Show at Stone Mountain.

Croker animated various "TNT Toons" promos for TNT in the early 1990s and helped animate and design bumpers for Cartoon Network in 1998. Croker also worked on various commercials and bumpers which often featured well-known cartoon characters.

Croker is best known for providing the voices of Zorak and Moltar in the Cartoon Network/Adult Swim/GameTap animated series Space Ghost Coast to Coast, throughout its entire run from 1994 until 2008. In addition to being the show's principal animator, it was also his idea to have Zorak and Moltar be Space Ghost's sidekicks. He also voiced Zorak on Cartoon Planet and The Brak Show and voiced Moltar as the host of Toonami from 1997 until 1999.

Croker served as an animator for Aqua Teen Hunger Force and its 2007 feature film adaption Aqua Teen Hunger Force Colon Movie Film for Theaters. He also provided the voices for Dr. Weird, Steve, and various characters for the series.

Croker provided the voice of Young Man and other various characters in Perfect Hair Forever.

Filmography

Death and tributes
On September 17, 2016, Croker suddenly became ill, vomiting and developing a fever. He believed it to be food poisoning from consuming sushi earlier in the day. After arriving home from an errand a few hours later, Croker's partner found him unresponsive, and he was pronounced dead by paramedics called to the residence minutes later; he was 54. No cause of death has been publicly given.

Adult Swim honored him by re-airing the first Space Ghost Coast to Coast episode produced, "Elevator", on September 19, 2016, as a special presentation. The tribute began with a brief description of Croker's contribution to Space Ghost and Adult Swim, with the words his character Zorak said in one episode: "Think of me when you look to the night sky", then the episode played. At the end of the episode, the screen shows "C. Martin Croker [1962-2016]". In the wake of the news of his death, Croker's friends and colleagues, such as his Coast to Coast friends George Lowe and Andy Merrill, paid tribute to him in posts on social media. Adult Swim made almost every episode of Space Ghost Coast to Coast available for free on their website in honor of him.

On September 24, 2016, Croker was honored at the beginning of Toonami in a segment in which T.O.M. receives a transmission from Moltar saying he's returning to his home planet and will not be coming back, then boasting that he was the better Toonami host. T.O.M. wishes Moltar the best of luck and says "May your oven stay forever lit." An image of Croker was then shown, captioned "(1962–2016)".

References

External links
 
 
 

1962 births
2016 deaths
20th-century American male actors
21st-century American male actors
Animators from Georgia (U.S. state)
American male bloggers
American bloggers
American male video game actors
American male voice actors
American male web series actors
Male actors from Atlanta
People from Smyrna, Georgia
Cartoon Network people
Deaths from sepsis